The 2022 Copa Chile (officially known as Copa Chile Easy 2022 due to its sponsorship), was the 42nd edition of the Copa Chile, the country's national football cup tournament. The tournament began on 19 March 2022 and ended on 13 November 2022, with the final match on neutral ground.

Magallanes won their first Copa Chile title, defeating Unión Española 7–6 on penalty kicks after a 2–2 draw in the final. Colo-Colo were the defending champions, but were eliminated by Ñublense in the round of 16.

Format 
The 2022 Copa Chile is based on a system of direct elimination with double-legged ties, similar to the Copa del Rey. In the first stage, clubs affiliated to ANFA (those from Tercera A, Tercera B and regional amateur leagues) and clubs from the Segunda División Profesional were paired into 14 ties with the winners and the best loser advancing to the second stage, in which those 15 teams were joined by the 17 Primera B clubs. In the third stage, the 16 second stage winners faced the 16 Primera División clubs which entered the competition at that point. The first and second stages, as well as the final, were played as single-legged ties, whilst the remaining rounds (third stage, round of 16, quarter-finals and semi-finals) were played under a double-legged format. VAR was implemented for the semi-finals and final.

Prizes 
The champions of this edition were entitled to earn the right to compete in the 2023 Copa Libertadores, taking the Chile 4 berth, and also earned the right to play the 2023 Supercopa de Chile against the 2022 Campeonato Nacional champions.

Schedule

Teams 
61 clubs took part in this edition of the Copa Chile: 16 from the Primera División, 17 from the Primera B, 12 from the Segunda División Profesional, 7 from Tercera A, 2 from Tercera B and 7 from regional amateur leagues.

Primera A

 Audax Italiano
 Cobresal
 Colo-Colo
 Coquimbo Unido
 Curicó Unido
 Deportes Antofagasta
 Deportes La Serena
 Everton
 Huachipato
 Ñublense
 O'Higgins
 Palestino
 Unión Española
 Unión La Calera
 Universidad Católica
 Universidad de Chile

Primera B

 Barnechea
 Cobreloa
 Deportes Copiapó
 Deportes Iquique
 Deportes Melipilla
 Deportes Puerto Montt
 Deportes Recoleta
 Deportes Santa Cruz
 Deportes Temuco
 Fernández Vial
 Magallanes
 Rangers
 San Luis
 Santiago Morning
 Santiago Wanderers
 Unión San Felipe
 Universidad de Concepción

Segunda División

 Deportes Concepción
 Deportes Limache
 Deportes Valdivia
 General Velásquez
 Iberia
 Independiente de Cauquenes
 Lautaro de Buin
 Real San Joaquín
 Rodelindo Román
 San Antonio Unido
 San Marcos de Arica
 Trasandino

Tercera A

 Brujas de Salamanca
 Deportes Quillón
 Deportes Rengo
 Provincial Ovalle
 Provincial Ranco
 Quintero Unido
 Unión Compañías

Tercera B

 Aguará
 Tricolor Municipal

Regional Amateur

 Colo-Colito
 Cóndor de Pichidegua
 Dante de Nueva Imperial
 La Higuera
 La Obra
 San Bernardo Unido
 Unión Bellavista

First stage 
The pairings for the first stage were announced by the ANFP on 10 March 2022. The 12 Segunda División teams were drawn against 12 teams from ANFA, with the four remaining ANFA sides being drawn against each other according to geographical and safety criteria. Ties in this round were single-legged, with the team from the lower tier hosting the match. Matches in this round were played on 19 and 20 March 2022.

Second stage 
The pairings for the second stage were announced by the ANFP on 20 March 2022. The 14 first stage winners, as well as San Bernardo Unido who advanced as best loser, were drawn against 15 Primera B de Chile teams according to geographical and safety criteria, with the remaining two Primera B teams being drawn against each other. Like the previous stage of the competition, ties in this round were single-legged, with the team from the lower tier hosting the match. Matches in this round were played from 26 to 28 March 2022.

Bracket

Third stage 
The draw for the third stage and subsequent phases was held on 10 May 2022. The 16 Primera División teams entered the competition at this stage and were drawn against the 16 second stage winners. The team with the highest seed assigned in the draw hosted the second leg. The first legs were played from 16 to 19 June and the second legs were played from 23 to 27 June 2022.

|}

First leg

Second leg

Round of 16 

|}

First leg

Second leg

Quarter-finals 

|}

First leg

Second leg

Semi-finals 

|}

First leg

Second leg

Final

Top scorers 

Source: Campeonato Chileno

See also 
 2022 Chilean Primera División
 2022 Primera B de Chile
 2022 Supercopa de Chile

References 

Chile
2022
Copa Chile